Meyer Guggenheim (February 1, 1828 – March 15, 1905) was the patriarch of what became known as the Guggenheim family in the United States, which became one of the world's wealthiest families during the 19th century, and remained so during the 20th.

Early life
Guggenheim was born in Lengnau, Aargau, Switzerland, on February 1, 1828.  He was the son of Simon Meyer Guggenheim and Schafeli (née Levinger) Guggenheim and was of Ashkenazi Jewish ancestry.

Career
After emigrating from Switzerland in 1847 to the United States, he launched a new life in the importing business. He ultimately made his fortune (one of the largest of the 19th century) through business ventures in mining and smelting, mostly in the United States.

After investing in silver mines in the Leadville mining district of Colorado, he expanded into ore smelting in Colorado. He built a number of smelters across the United States and in northern Mexico. As his several sons grew up, they assumed leading roles in the family mining and smelting business.

Personal life
Guggenheim met Barbara Myers (1834–1900), a fellow immigrant on the ship to the United States, and married her four years later around 1852. Together, they were the parents of ten surviving children. 

Five of their seven sons were active in the family businesses, including:

 Isaac Guggenheim (1854–1922), who married Carrie Sonneborn in 1876.
 Daniel Guggenheim (1856–1930), head of the family after his father's death, who was the most active of his sons in developing and acquiring worldwide mining interests.
 Maurice Guggenheim (1858–1939), originally in the lace and embroidery import business; by 1881, he was a financier involved in mining and smelting.
 Solomon Robert Guggenheim (1861–1949), a supporter of modern art through his foundation and donations to the Museum of Modern Art.
 Jeanette Guggenheim (1863–1889), married Albert Gerstle and died in childbirth.
 Benjamin Guggenheim (1865–1912), who died in the Titanic disaster. He married Florette Seligman.
 John Simon Guggenheim (1867–1941), a one-term senator from Colorado.
 William Guggenheim (1868–1941)
 Rose Guggenheim (1871–1945), who married three times; first to Albert Loeb (head of the New York Stock Exchange), second to Samuel M. Goldsmith in 1908, and third to Charles E. Quicke.
 Cora Gwendalyn Guggenheim (1873–1956), who married to Louis Frank Rothschild, founder of L.F. Rothschild.

After his wife's death in 1900, Guggenheim and his sons provided $200,000 to Mount Sinai Hospital for the construction of a hospital in her honor.  Guggenheim died on March 15, 1905, in Palm Beach, Florida.  He was interred at the Salem Fields Cemetery in Brooklyn, New York.

Descendants
Through his son Benjamin, Guggenheim was a grandfather of art collector and socialite Peggy Guggenheim.

References

External links
 National Mining Hall of Fame:  Meyer Guggenheim
 

1828 births
1905 deaths
People from Zurzach District
Swiss Ashkenazi Jews
19th-century American businesspeople
American people of German-Jewish descent
American people of Swiss-Jewish descent
American businesspeople in metals
American mining businesspeople
Meyer Guggenheim
Swiss emigrants to the United States
Burials at Salem Fields Cemetery